El Pi de Sant Just is a locality located in the municipality of Olius, in Province of Lleida province, Catalonia, Spain. As of 2020, it has a population of 782.

Geography 
El Pi de Sant Just is located 112km east-northeast of Lleida.

References

Populated places in the Province of Lleida